Jesse Parete (born 20 April 1993) is a New Zealand rugby union player for the Highlanders in Super Rugby. His position is in the back row. He also plays for the New England Free Jacks in Major League Rugby (MLR) in the United States. 

Parete made his Super Rugby debut vs the Jaguares in Round 12, scoring a try in the final minutes of the match.

References

External links
Bay of Plenty Steamers player profiles

1993 births
New Zealand rugby union players
Chiefs (rugby union) players
Rugby union flankers
Living people
Rugby union players from Hāwera
Rugby union locks
Rugby union number eights
Bay of Plenty rugby union players
Taranaki rugby union players
Highlanders (rugby union) players
Yokohama Canon Eagles players
New England Free Jacks players